Vincent Dixie (born August 20, 1973) is an American businessman, politician, and a Democratic member of the Tennessee House of Representatives, representing District 54 since November 2018. Dixie is one of 32 freshman members of the 111th Tennessee General Assembly. He succeeded Brenda Gilmore after she was sworn into the Tennessee Senate.

Background 
Dixie attended Tennessee State University where he received his bachelor's degree in Accounting (BBA) in 1997 and a Masters in Business Administration (MBA) in 2004. In 2009, he founded the bail bonding companies A Way Out Bonding and Bail U Out Bonding. Prior to this he worked in the health care industry as an international auditor for Hospital Corporation of America and Ardent Health Services.

2018 Election 
The following are the results for the 2018 District 54 Election:

Legislative committees 
Dixie currently serves as a member of the following legislative committees:

 Education Committee
 K–12 Subcommittee
 Health Committee
 Public Health Subcommittee

Political positions and sponsored bills

Criminal justice 
Dixie sponsored HB 0883, a bill which allows felons who have gone at least five years without incident the opportunity to petition to have their criminal history sealed. He also sponsored HB 0881, a bill called the "Drug Treatment Instead of Incarceration Act".

Education 
Dixie sponsored HB1550, the "Tennessee Education Savings Account Pilot Program", a school voucher program for low- and middle-income students.

Health care 
Dixie sponsored the following bills in relation to health including HB 887, which is the "Prescription Drug Fair Pricing Act", HB 1259, which will expand Medicaid eligibility to people who have an opioid addiction and make less than the Federal poverty level, in the duration of their active involvement at any approved substance abuse treatment facility.

Gun rights 
In 2018, Dixie received a rating of 13% from the National Rifle Association in regards to his gun rights positions.

Personal life 
Dixie attends St. Vincent de Paul Catholic Church where he serves as a member of the church's finance committee.

Others community involvements are:

 member, Omega Psi Phi fraternity
 member, National Association of Black Accountants
 member, Tennessee Association of Professional Bail Agents
 knight/ member, Knights of Peter Claver
 fellow/ co-chair, New Leaders Council Nashville Chapter
 House Member, 111th General Assembly
Democratic Caucus Treasurer

References

External links
Official page at the Tennessee General Assembly
Official Campaign Website

1973 births
Living people
Tennessee State University alumni
Democratic Party members of the Tennessee House of Representatives
Politicians from Nashville, Tennessee
People from Davidson County, Tennessee
21st-century American politicians
Knights of Peter Claver & Ladies Auxiliary